The Ait Atta (Berber language: Ayt Ɛeṭṭa, ⴰⵢⵜ ⵄⵟⵟⴰ) are a large Berber tribal confederation of South eastern Morocco, estimated to number about 330,000 as of 1960. They are divided into "five fifths" (khams khmas), all said to descend from the forty sons of their common ancestor Dadda Atta: these "fifths" are the Ayt Wallal, Ayt Wahlim, Ayt Isful, Ayt Yazza and Ayt Unbgi. They speak Tachelhit and Central Atlas Tamazight. ("Aït" has the meaning of "people of" in the Tamazight language).

The Ait Atta originated as a political entity in the Jbel Saghro region in the 16th century with the founding of their traditional capital Iɣerm Amazdar. They subsequently expanded first northwards, becoming rivals of the Ait Yafelman, then southwards, taking control of oases in Tafilalt and the Draa River. By the 19th century their raids went as far as Touat (in modern-day Algeria). They fiercely resisted the French entry into Morocco until 1933 and were the last of Morocco to fall.

At each tribal level, the head was traditionally elected according to the principles of rotation and complementarity: each lineage took turns to occupy the position, but when it was a particular lineage's turn to hold the office, only members of other lineages could choose the candidate. In ordinary circumstances, power traditionally rested mainly with local councils of family heads, the ajmuɛ, who decided cases according to customary law, izerf. In the oases they conquered, the Ait Atta originally dominated a stratified society, where the haratin who worked the land were often forbidden from owning it, and needed a protection agreement with an Ait Atta patron; this stratification has considerably receded since Moroccan independence with the establishment of legal equality.

Subdivision 

Ait Unbi

 Ait Ihya
 Ait Amr
 Ait Irjadln
 Ait Aksil

Ait Yaza

 Ait Krad Ikhsan
 Ait Gumas
 Ait Asa
 Ait Butrurt
 Ait Hamu
 Ait Uma

Ait Ulal

 Ait Uzine
 Ait Arbse
 Ait Ulal
 Ait Buskir
 Ait Mskur
 Ait slilal
 Ait Umerjdin
 Ait Arba

Ait Wahlim

 Ait Butklifa
 Ait Huran
 Ait Masin
 Imadren
 Ait Su n Afela

Ait Isful

 Ait Anzar
 Ait Buaghrum
 Ait Hitlar
 Ait Ichu
 Ait Bafghf
 Ait Hani

Territory of Ait Atta

Significant cities and towns

 Merzouga
 Rissani
 Fezzou
 Alnif
 Tinghir
 M'semrir
 Boumalne-Dades
 Tazzarine
 Tamegroute
 Oumjrane

Folklore

Tarrirt

According to Ait Atta stories, Tarrirt, which could be identified with Teryel is a witch which roams the mountains. She's considered to be very real and the locals are very convinced about her existence. She's supposed seen appearing on mountain peaks staring at people, or seducting and attacking men while helping and blessing women and men that treat women well.

Black magic

Black magic in Morocco is popular, but more so with the people of Ait Atta. Reportedly many Moroccans visit Ait Atta cities for rituals.

References

Berber peoples and tribes
Moroccan tribes
Berbers in Morocco